The Desert Sky Wind Farm is a 160.5 megawatt (MW) wind power station near the far West Texas town of Iraan, in Pecos County. The wind farm consists of 107 GE wind turbines, each rated at 1.5 megawatts spread over a  area. American Electric Power (AEP) owns the facility and CPS Energy of San Antonio purchases all power produced under long-term agreements with AEP.

See also

List of power stations in Texas
Wind power in Texas

References

External links
Desert Sky Wind

Wind farms in Texas
Buildings and structures in Pecos County, Texas
American Electric Power
CPS Energy